George Allen JP (1814 – 10 May 1899) was Mayor of Wellington, New Zealand, for three weeks in 1879.

Origins
Allen was originally a Deal boatbuilder. He migrated to Wellington on the Catherine Stuart Forbes in 1841. Apart from living in the Hutt for eight years he spent all his life in Wellington. He was a boat builder by profession and had a business in Thorndon. He was also the Chairman of Directors of the Trust and Loan Company until his death.

He died on 10 May 1899 aged almost 85 at his residence in Wellington after a heart attack. Allen was a member of the Court Sir George Grey AOF. He was married and had five daughters and four sons. His wife died in 1888.

Civic service
He was a member of the Wellington Provincial Council from 1861 to 1865 for the City of Wellington electorate.  From 1876 to 1883, and again from 1887 to 1888, Allen served as a Wellington City Councillor. For a brief period in 1879 he was acting mayor. He was noted as being an attentive and zealous councillor. He was also a hospital trustee.

Allen Street in Wellington is named after him.

Notes

References

No Mean City by Stuart Perry (1969, Wellington City Council) includes a paragraph and a portrait or photo for each mayor.

1814 births
1899 deaths
Burials at Bolton Street Cemetery
Mayors of Wellington
Members of the Wellington Provincial Council
19th-century New Zealand politicians